

Musical career 
At the age of 12, MC Norman (Ronald Mutebi) started his music career in Afrigo band working with Joanita Kawalya and Peterson Mutebi back in 1987.

He later joined MM Disco Sound, a Missouri Night Club, and worked with guys such as the late Ivan Matama, DJ Lubba Style and Rhino Kalemba before joining Jose Chameleone and DJ Bernazor as dancers and MCs for Missouri Club every Wednesday and Friday.

MC Norman was widely acknowledged after working with Sam Amooti and Paddy at Jaaja Ansinansi and working at Vibration Disco Club alongside Junior Plies Compious, DJ Roberto, Papa Cidy, DJ Henry and Lota back in the days.

He joined his brother and former Bakayimbira Dramactors actor, Philip Ganja in South Africa in 1998 after briefly working at Vibes Sound.

Together with his brother, Norman started a music and film production company under their father's name "Ganja" Music Production to help upgrade talent.

The two brothers have worked with some of the top South African Kwaito artists including Arthur Mafokate, the late Zombo, Purity and Penny Penny the Shangani music star.
Their film company has produced movies like "Welcome to South Africa" which sold up to 2 million copies in Uganda and 5000 copies in South Africa on the day of its release. They also produced "Buladina", a tribute film about the life of fallen star Paulo Kafeero. 

MC Norman worked on his latest 2017 single titled "Wine Fi Mi" with one of South African's best DJ and Producer —DJ Clap of the famous group Uhuru (Kalawa). He also featured another big Afrobeat South African group called Smile . 
Mc Norman has also worked with Dj Buckz a Uhulu Kalawa and Zander Baronet on the new single titled Feel . He recently dropped a new single featuring Pallaso and Stanley Enow from cameroon and the titled is Mulongo which was included on his new Ep Cross Border with 5 tracks

Awards 

Won:
 Beffta Awards UK – Best International Act
 2014  HiPipo Music Awards (Hipipo Music Awards) – Best Chart Artist 2014
 2015 AFRIMA Awards       - Africa Song Writer of the year 2015
 2019 Hipipo Best artist diaspora 

Nominated:
 2014 Afrimma awards – Best African Dancehall Artist Nominee Texas United States 
 2014 IRAWMA awards – 2014 Best world new entertainer (IRAWMA awards) Florida Miami 
 2014 HiPipo Music Awards - 2014 Best reggae song, best diaspora artist, best chart artist 
2019 Hipipo Music Awards -Best artist Diaspora

References

External links 
 News About Mc Norman
http://www.entertainment-online.co.za/mcnorman.htm
Full list of Hipipo Awards Winners 2019 
http://www.ugandandiasporanews.com/2013/08/04/a-south-african-music-experience-by-ugandan-reggae-artist-mc-norman-real-names-mutebi-norman/
http://www.twitter.com/mcnormanganja

21st-century Ugandan male singers
1978 births
Living people